MSRB may refer to:
 Municipal Securities Rulemaking Board, an organisation
 Peptide-methionine (R)-S-oxide reductase, an enzyme